is a Japanese sci-fi/mecha anime film directed by Mamoru Nagano.

The film debut in Japan on November 1, 2012.

The lore of The Five Star Stories was retconned starting with volume 13 onwards to better match the movie lore.

Plot 
Gothicmade describes a world, that consists of little colonies, named Carmine.

In this world, Songstresses are powerful young women who inherit the memories and knowledge of those who came before them. They then pursue the goal of liberating the populace suffering under the corrupt and ruling interplanetary league.

The story starts with the young Bellin Ajelli (16 y.o.) who has just been reborn as a Songstress and is determined to run a pilgrimage across the planet as she meets Prince Truhallon, willing to protect her against the regime, but his status describes the embodiment of that what Bellin is trying fighting against.

The story describes the struggles and development of those the characters as they travel alongside each other trying to reach the capital.

Cast
Maria Kawamura
Nozomu Sasaki
Kotono Mitsuishi

References

External links
Official website 

2012 anime films
2012 directorial debut films
2012 films
Films directed by Mamoru Nagano
Japanese animated films